Parry Sound/Frying Pan Island-Sans Souci Water Aerodrome  is located  southwest of Parry Sound, Ontario, Canada.

See also
 List of airports in the Parry Sound area

References

Registered aerodromes in Parry Sound District
Seaplane bases in Ontario